The Mega Man Retro Roto Figure line is an action figure toyline based on the characters from the original or classic Mega Man series.  They were first released in 2005 by Jazwares, a toy company based in Sunrise, Florida.  The figures are approximately 6 inches tall (though some vary in height) and are made of super durable roto-molded PVC plastic.  Fans of Mega Man and action figure collectors have praised the figures for their immaculate detail and resemblance to the original art work of Mega Man character designer Keiji Inafune.

Releases

In 2005, Jazwares released the first series (known as Wave 1) of the Mega Man Retro Roto Figures.  This first series featured Mega Man, Proto Man, Elec Man, Shadow Man, and Guts Man.  Each of these five figures included a "Build-A-Bot" piece that could be used to assemble a sixth bonus figure known as "Full-Charge" Mega Man.  The release of this initial first wave was limited and apparently it did not sell as well as expected.  Consequently, Jazwares shelved the line by quietly discontinuing it in 2006.

In 2010, Jazwares re-released Wave 1 in a re-launch of the Retro Roto figure line.  There are two major differences between this re-launch and the initial release in 2005.  First, for whatever reason, the Guts Man figure is not part of the re-launch.  Only Mega Man, Proto Man, Elec Man, and Shadow Man figures have been re-released, making Guts Man the rarest figure in the series.  Despite this, Guts Man was featured on the back of the cards of all the re-released figures, leading collectors to speculate that he may be re-released at a later date.  Second, the "Build-A-Bot" pieces for the "Full-Charge" Mega Man figure are not included with the four re-released figures.

Wave 1 (2005)

Mega Man (with "Build-A-Bot" right arm)
Proto Man (with "Build-A-Bot" legs)
Elec Man (with "Build-A-Bot" chest)
Shadow Man (with "Build-A-Bot" head)
Guts Man (with "Build-A-Bot" left arm)

Wave 1 (2010 Re-Release)

Mega Man
Proto Man
Elec Man
Shadow Man

Wave 2 and future releases

When Jazwares originally released Wave 1 in 2005, a second series (Wave 2) was designed and planned for release shortly afterwards.  On the back of the cards of the Wave 1 figures, the robot masters Ice Man and Wood Man were even advertised as "coming soon."  At the 2005 American International Toy Fair, Jazwares indicated that it planned to release Ice Man, Wood Man, and Bass as part of Wave 2 while Metal Man and Skull Man were being planned for a Wave 3 release.  At the 2006 American International Toy Fair the following year, prototypes of the Wave 2 were unveiled.  Among the characters in the planned Wave 2 release were Ice Man, Wood Man, Heat Man, Snake Man, and Dr. Wily.   Due to apparently underwhelming sales of the initial Wave 1 release, however, Wave 2 was cancelled.

After the re-release of the Wave 1 Retro Roto figures in 2010, there was speculation amongst collectors of the figure line that Jazwares may finally release Wave 2.  On the back of the cards for all the re-released figures both Ice Man and Wood Man were once again advertised as "coming soon."  At the 2010 American International Toy Fair, Joe Amarro of Jazwares was quoted in an interview as saying, "I'm pushing for Wave 2 myself.  Hopefully we can finally get those out."  Thus far, no future releases have been confirmed, but on November 22, 2010 Jazwares announced in a press release that they had secured the licensing rights from Capcom to continue producing Mega Man figures in 2011.

Wave 2 (Currently Unreleased)

Ice Man
Wood Man
Heat Man
Dr. Wily

Other Possible Releases

Metal Man
Skull Man
Bass

References

Action figures